Pir Sohawa (Urdu: پیر سوہاوہ) is a rapidly developing tourist resort located  from Islamabad on top of Margalla Hills. It has a 3000 plus ft elevation and is geographically part of Haripur District.

Like many other parts of the Margalla Hills, Haripur and Galyat mountains, Pir Sohawa sees rapid, uncontrolled development and encroachment on National Park land, which results in damages to the environment through pollution and heavy traffic.

On 6 January 2012, after almost six years, Pir Sohawa received few inches of snowfall.

Tourist attractions 

Pir Sohawa is at the top of several hiking trails of the Margalla Hills.

Dino Valley is a large theme park in the hills, having a variety of cafes and children's play areas for all ages. Its location adds to the traffic problems along Pir Sohawa road.

See also 
Daman-e-Koh
Margalla Hills

References 

Tourist attractions in Islamabad
Climbing areas of Pakistan
Hiking trails in Pakistan